Hannesson is an Icelandic patronymic, literally meaning "son of Hannes". Notable people with the name include:

Eggert Hannesson, 16th-century Icelandic hirðstjóri and lawspeaker
Guðbjartur Hannesson (1950–2015), Icelandic politician
Hannes Marino Hannesson (1884–1958), Canadian politician
Pálmi Hannesson (1898–1956), Icelandic naturalist and rector of Menntaskólinn í Reykjavík

Icelandic-language surnames